Kimberworth is a suburb of Rotherham, South Yorkshire, England. It is located in the Metropolitan Borough of Rotherham, about 2.2 miles (3.5 km) north-west of Rotherham town centre and 4.7 miles (7.6 km) north-east of the City of Sheffield.

History
Kimberworth is mentioned in the 1086 Domesday Book, where it is noted as "Chiberworde". Kimberworth castle, now demolished, was located near The Drawbridge pub. The monks at nearby Kirkstead Abbey were smelting iron from around 1160, the rest of the history of this area is heavily influenced by industrial developments, especially in iron, steel and coal.

There is evidence of human activity in this area going back 5000 years. The area was settled by Brigantes, before the arrival of the Romans. The Roman expansion north was halted by the Brigantes forts at Kimberworth and Wincobank.

The present manor house at Kimberworth was built in 1694 by the Kent family, long prominent at Kimberworth, who married with, amongst others, the Rawson family of Upperthorpe and the Creswick family that had owned land at Owlerton since the fourteenth century.

Places of worship
The Kimberworth area has several churches, the most prominent being St Thomas's Anglican Church on Church Street, construction of which was started in 1842. The Salvation Army has a meeting hall on High Street, this is also used by the 1st Rotherham Cub Scout pack. Kimberworth United Reformed Church met in a building on Kimberworth Road overlooking Bradgate Park (Church closed in 2010). Church now demolished

Landmarks
 Thundercliffe Grange – 1770s

Schools
Kimberworth was served by Kimberworth Comprehensive School and Old Hall Comprehensive School until 2004 when they were merged to form Winterhill School, built on the site of the latter.

Notable people
Dean Andrews, actor who appeared in Life on Mars, used to live in Kimberworth
David Seaman, England football goalkeeper lived in nearby Ferham and attended Kimberworth Comprehensive School
Rowland Suddaby (1912–1972), British artist and illustrator, born there

See also
Listed buildings in Rotherham (Keppel Ward)

References

External links

 

Geography of Rotherham